Stanley John Bissell (26 October 1906 – January 1999) was an English freestyle and Greco-Roman sport wrestler who competed for Great Britain in the 1948 Summer Olympics.

In the 1948 Summer Olympics he competed in the Greco-Roman tournament as a middleweight.

At the 1930 Empire Games he won the silver medal in the freestyle middleweight class. Four years later he won again the silver medal in the freestyle middleweight category at the 1934 Empire Games.

References

External links
 

1906 births
1999 deaths
Olympic wrestlers of Great Britain
Wrestlers at the 1948 Summer Olympics
British male sport wrestlers
Wrestlers at the 1930 British Empire Games
Wrestlers at the 1934 British Empire Games
Commonwealth Games silver medallists for England
Commonwealth Games medallists in wrestling
Medallists at the 1930 British Empire Games
Medallists at the 1934 British Empire Games